The Nebraska Correctional Center for Women (NCCW) is a state correctional facility for the Nebraska Department of Correctional Services. Located just west of York, Nebraska, it is the only secure state facility to house adult women.

NCCW, began operation in May, 1920, through an act of the Nebraska State Legislature establishing the "State Reformatory for Women." The original facility consisted of a 2-story house that was used as an inmate and staff residence. The facility was a working dairy farm. The inmates assisted with the livestock. NCCW houses all security classification levels of female inmates including those in its own Diagnostic and Evaluation Center (D&E) (All male new commitments are taken to the Nebraska Diagnostic and Evaluation Center located in Lincoln). The NCCW D&E houses all new commitments. The average stay of a new commitment in the NCCW D&E is 30 days. This allows the inmate time to adjust to the institution and to learn about the institution's programs, rules, and regulations. During the evaluation period staff develop a personalized classification plan for the inmate.

NCCW has been accredited by the American Correctional Association since 1981.

Security Levels:  NCCW houses all classifications levels of female inmates including new commitments, court-ordered evaluators, and safe-keepers from county facilities.
Average Population:  281
Number of Staff:  116
Cost per Inmate per Year:  $29,417.00

Notable inmates
Caril Ann Fugate, spree killer, paroled in 1976.

External links
 Nebraska Correctional Center for Women Official website

Prisons in Nebraska
Buildings and structures in York County, Nebraska
Women's prisons in the United States
Capital punishment in the United States
Women in Nebraska
1920 establishments in Nebraska